George E. Grant (born 1954 in Houston, Texas) is an American evangelical writer, and a Presbyterian Church in America (PCA) pastor.

He was a church planter and pastor in Texas for ten years. He then served as an assistant to D. James Kennedy at the Coral Ridge Presbyterian Church and taught at Knox Theological Seminary. Following his move to Tennessee in 1991, Grant founded the King's Meadow Study Center and Franklin Classical School in Franklin. In 2006, he helped found New College Franklin, a Christian liberal arts college. Grant has also founded several Christian schools in northern Iraq. He is "a prolific author of Christian books." He is currently involved in church planting in Middle Tennessee and serves as the pastor of Parish Presbyterian Church in Franklin, Tennessee.

Grant is an anti-abortion advocate.

Grant is a prominent figure in the Christian reconstructionist movement in the United States, and has been noted for his extremely conservative views, particularly on the topic of homosexuality.

Education
Grant has degrees in Political Science from the University of Houston (B.A.), Philosophy from Whitefield Theological Seminary (M.A., D. Litt, PhD.), Humanities from Belhaven College (D. Hum.), and Theology from Knox Theological Seminary (D. Min. Cand.).

Career
Grant is a former vice president of Coral Ridge Presbyterian Church, a Florida megachurch, and has been a lecturer at Knox Theological Seminary.  Grant became Executive Director of the Coral Ridge ministry on February 1, 1990; the ministry had a $17 million annual budget in 1990.

Grant planted Parish Presbyterian Church in Franklin, Tennessee in 2006.  He continues to be Pastor.  Grant is the founder of Franklin Classical School, a K - 12, college preparatory, classical school  in Franklin, Tennessee.

Political activity
In 1991 Grant was one of the founders of the U.S. Taxpayers' Party, which sought to  outlaw abortion, end government funding for  the Department of Education and the National Endowment for the Arts, and replace government funded welfare benefits with  private charity.

Beliefs
Grant is a notable Christian reconstructionist; Reason magazine in 1998 quoted him as saying "World conquest. It is dominion we are after...." Grant appeared in the 2017 creationist documentary film Is Genesis History?, in which he advocates for young Earth creationism.

In his 1993 book Legislating Immorality: the Homosexual Movement Comes out of the Closet, Grant wrote positively about past executions of gay people. He criticized the abandoning of the death penalty for homosexuality, writing that "[s]adly, the 20th century saw this remarkable 2,000-year-old commitment suddenly dissipate."

In 2016, Grant was a plaintiff in a lawsuit against a Tennessee county clerk and the state attorney general arguing that legalization of same-sex marriage infringed on their rights as voters. The suit was dismissed by the county and again by the appellate court, who found the plaintiffs suffered no harm and lacked legal standing.

In his 1987 book The Changing of the Guard: Biblical Principles for Political Action, Grant wrote "Christians have an obligation, a mandate, a holy responsibility to reclaim the land for Jesus Christ, to have dominion in civil structures just as in every other aspect of life and godliness. But it is dominion we are after, not just a voice. It is dominion we are after, not just influence. It is dominion we are after, not just equal time. It is dominion we are after. World conquest, that's what Christ has commissioned us to accomplish. We must win the world with the power of the Gospel, and we must never settle for anything less. Thus Christian politics has as its primary intent the conquest of the land, of men, families, institutions, bureaucracies, courts, and governments for the kingdom of Christ."

Published books

Author or co-Author
The American Vision, 1984
Bringing in the Sheaves: Replacing Government Welfare with Biblical Charity, 1985, '89, '95
In the Shadow of Plenty: Biblical Principles for Welfare, 1986, '98, 2009
The Dispossessed: Homelessness in America, 1986
To the Work: A Handbook for Church Diaconal Ministry, 1986
The Changing of the Guard: The Vital Role Christians Play in America’s Unfolding Cultural Drama, 1987, '95
The Catechism of the New Age: A Response to Dungeons and Dragons, with Peter Leithart, 1987
Rebuilding the Walls: A Biblical Strategy for Restoring America's Greatness, with Peter Waldron, 1987
Grand Illusions: The Legacy of Planned Parenthood, 1988, 1993, 1998, 2000  
Trial and Error: The American Civil Liberties Union and Its Impact on Your Family, 1989, '93
The Legacy of Planned Parenthood, 1989
Third Time Around: The History of the Pro-Life Movement from the First Century to the Present, 1990, 2010
Clean Air: A Citizen's Handbook for Media Accountability, with Peter Leithart, 1990
In Defense of Greatness: How Biblical Character Shapes A Nation's Destiny, with Peter Leithart, 1990
The Walls Came Tumbling Down: The Fall of Communism in Our Time, with Peter Leithart, 1990
The Blood of the Moon: Understanding the Conflict between Islam and Western Civilization, 1991, 2001
The Quick and the Dead: RU-486 and the New Chemical Warfare Against Your Family, 1991
Homelessness In America: Its Causes and Its Cures, 1991
Unnatural Affections: The Impuritan Ethic of the Modern Church, 1991
The Last Crusader: The Untold Story of Christopher Columbus, 1992
: The Wacky Wit, Wisdom, and Wonderment of Hillary Rodham-Clinton, 1992
Perot: The Populist Appeal of Strong-Man Politics, 1992
The 57% Solution: A Conservative Strategy for the Next Four Years, 1993
Where Do We Go From Here: An Agenda for Conservatives During Cultural Captivity, 1993
Legislating Immorality: The Homosexual Movement Comes Out of the Closet, with Mark Horne, 1993
The Family Under Siege: What the New Social Engineers Have in Mind for Your Children, 1994
The Micah Mandate: Balancing the Christian Life, 1995, '99, 2010
Killer Angel: A Biography of Margaret Sanger, 1995, 2000, 2010, 2014
The Dittohead’s Little Instruction Book, 1996
You Might Be a Liberal If, 1996
Our Character, Our Future: Reclaiming America’s Moral Destiny, with Alan Keyes, 1996
Immaculate Deception: The Shifting Agenda of Planned Parenthood, 1996
Buchanan: Caught in the Crossfire, 1996
Moral Earthquakes, with O.S. Hawkins, 1996
Bless This Food, with Karen Grant and Julia Pitkin, 1996
The Patriot’s Handbook: A Citizenship Primer, 1996, 2001
Carry a Big Stick: The Uncommon Heroism of Theodore Roosevelt, 1996
Faithful Volunteers: The History of Religion in Tennessee, with Stephen Mansfield, 1997
Letters Home: Counsel from the Sages of the Past to their Loved Ones, with Karen Grant, 1997
Logomorphs: A Politically Incorrect Dictionary, 1997
The Reader’s Journal: The Stirling Bridge Classics Program, 1997
Best Friends: Lessons from Extraordinary Relationships through the Ages, with Karen Grant, 1998
Kids Who Kill: Confronting Our Culture of Violence, with Governor Mike Huckabee, 1998
Y2K: A Novel, with Michael Hyatt, 1998
Just Visiting: How Travel Has Enlightened Lives Throughout History, with Karen Grant, 1999
Lost Causes: The Romantic Attraction of Defeated Men and Movements, with Karen Grant, 1999
Shelf Life: How Books Have Changed the Destinies of Men and Nations, with Karen Grant, 1999
Going Somewhere: A Dan and Bea Adventure, 1999
Christmas Spirit: The Celebrations of the Season, with Gregory Wilbur, 1999
The Pocket Patriot: Citizenship Basics for the New Millennium, 2000
The Christian Almanac: Each Day in History, with Gregory Wilbur, 2000, '02
Garden Graces: How the Tasks of Gardening Have Shaped Art, Music, and History, with Karen Grant, 2001
The Absolutes: The Indisputable Principles of Civilized Society, with James Robison, 2002
Center of the Storm: Practicing Principled Leadership in Times of Crisis, with Katherine Harris, 2002
An Emerging Nation: The American War of Independence, 2003
The Importance of the Electoral College, 2004
The Courage of Theodore Roosevelt, 2005On the Road to Independence, with Gary DeMar, 2006Cheerful Givers, 2008The American Patriot's Handbook: The Writings, History, and Spirit of a Free Nation, 2009, 2016

EditorHomosexuality, the Military, and the Future: The Moral and Strategic Crisis, editor, 1993Gays in the Military: A Caveat Collection, editor, 1993Hero Tales: How Common Lives Reveal the Uncommon Genius of America, editor, 2000From Bannockburn to Flodden: Tales by Sir Walter Scott, editor, 2001From Gileskirk to Greyfriars: Tales by Sir Walter Scott, editor, 2001From Glencoe to Stirling Bridge: Tales by Sir Walter Scott, editor, 2001From Montrose to Culloden: Tales by Sir Walter Scott, editor, 2001Q and I: An Arthur Quiller-Couch Anthology, editor, 2003Parish Life: A Thomas Chalmers Anthology, editor, 2003Thomas Jefferson, by John Morse, editor, 2005George Washington, by Henry Cabot Lodge, editor, 2005The Expulsive Power of a New Affection: A Sermon by Thomas Chalmers, editor, 2007, 09A Sabbath Psalter: Scripture Readings by Thomas Chalmers'', editor, 2010

Personal life
Grant lives near Franklin with his wife and co-author Karen. They have three grown children and six grandchildren.

References

External links
Grantian Florilegium - George Grant's blog

1954 births
Living people
Christian Young Earth creationists
Presbyterian Church in America ministers
People from Franklin, Tennessee
University of Houston alumni
People from Houston
Belhaven University alumni
Educators from Texas